Silva Escura e Dornelas (Portuguese: União de Freguesias de Silva Escura e Dornelas) is a parish in Sever do Vouga, Aveiro District, Portugal. The population in 2011 was 2,318, in an area of 24.19 km2.

References

Freguesias of Sever do Vouga